Glaphyromorphus darwiniensis, also known commonly as Darwin's ground skink and the northern mulch-skink, is a species of lizard in the family Scincidae. The species is endemic to Australia.

Etymology
The specific name, darwiniensis, refers to the city of Darwin, Northern Territory, Australia.

Geographic range
G. darwiniensis is found in Northern Territory and Western Australia.

Habitat
The preferred natural habitat of G. darwiniensis is forest.

Behavior
G. darwiniensis is terrestrial and fossorial.

Reproduction
G. darwiniensis is oviparous.

References

Further reading
Cogger HG (2014). Reptiles and Amphibians of Australia, Seventh Edition. Clayton, Victoria, Australia: CSIRO Publishing. xxx + 1,033 pp. .
Greer AE (1990). "Notes on reproduction in the skink Sphenomorphus darwiniensis ". Northern Territory Naturalist 12: 27–28. (Sphenomorphus darwiniensis, new taxonomic status).
Storr GM (1967). "The genus Sphenomorphus (Lacertilia, Scincidae) in Western Australia and the Northern Territory". Journal of the Royal Society of Western Australia 50 (1): 10–20. (Sphenomorphus crassicaudus darwiniensis, new subspecies, p. 19).
Wilson S, Swan G (2013). A Complete Guide to Reptiles of Australia, Fourth Edition. Sydney: New Holland Publishers. 522 pp. .

Glaphyromorphus
Reptiles described in 1967
Taxa named by Glen Milton Storr